The Municipality of Dornava is a small municipality in northeastern Slovenia. It lies east of Ptuj, partly on the Pesnica River and partly in the Slovene Hills. The seat of the municipality is the settlement of Dornava. The area is part of the traditional region of Styria. The municipality is now included in the Drava Statistical Region.

Settlements
In addition to the municipal seat of Dornava, the municipality also includes the following settlements:

 Bratislavci
 Brezovci
 Lasigovci
 Mezgovci ob Pesnici
 Polenci
 Polenšak
 Prerad
 Slomi
 Strejaci
 Strmec pri Polenšaku
 Žamenci

Gallery

References

External links

Municipality of Dornava on Geopedia
Dornava municipal site

Dornava